The Singer is the seventh studio album by American actress and singer Liza Minnelli. The album is a milestone in Minnelli's career as it is her only studio album (i.e. non-soundtrack) to reach the Top 40 on the Billboard 200 Album chart. The album also peaked at number 45 in the UK Albums Chart. The album was re-released in CD by Cherry Red Records with 4 additional bonus tracks.

Track listing

Personnel
Engineered by Lenny Roberts
Arranged by Al Capps
Vocals arranged by Marvin Hamlisch
Art direction by Ron Coro
Photography by Alan Pappé
Recorded and overdubbed at Larrabee Sound, Hollywood, Ca.

Charts

References

Liza Minnelli albums
1973 albums
Albums produced by Snuff Garrett
Columbia Records albums